This is a list of tennis players who have represented the Italy Davis Cup team in an official Davis Cup match. Italy have taken part in the competition since 1922.

Players

See also
 Italy Davis Cup team
 Tennis in Italy

References

External links

Lists of Davis Cup tennis players
Davis Cup